Smilax melastomifolia, the Hawai'i greenbrier, is a species of spiny vine found in nature only in the Hawaiian Islands. Spines occur not only on the stems but also on the underside of the leaves and on the peduncles of female flowers. Berries are white or pale green.

References

External links
National Tropical Botanical Garden, Hawai'i
Marine Life Photography, Honolulu

Smilacaceae
Endemic flora of Hawaii
Plants described in 1816
Flora without expected TNC conservation status